Plastic City is a 2008 Brazilian-Chinese-Hong Kong-Japanese thriller film directed by Yu Lik-wai.

Plot
Set in the traditional neighborhood of Liberdade in downtown São Paulo, Plastic City has an immense Eastern community that was established over the years as protagonist, people who are seeking for a land of opportunity and a place for new business - legal or illegal. It is in the midst of Chinese cultural traditions and the chaos of urban life that the immigrant Yuda and his son Kirin are commanding a piracy mafia in Brazil, but this empire went into decline when they were threatened by a powerful organization with strong international influences.

Cast 
Anthony Wong as Yuda
Joe Odagiri as Kirin
Domingos Antonio as Federal Agent
Alessandro Azevedo as Camacho
Ricardo Bittencourt as Guilhermo
Chao Chen as Yanno
Rodrigo dos Santos as Marquito
Barbara Garcia as Black Dancer
Huang Yi as Ocho
Renata Jesion as Reporter
Hiyan Kubagawa as Kirin 5 Years
Tainá Müller as Rita
Eliseu Paranhos as Sheriff
Antônio Petrin as Coelho
David Pond as Uncle Tong
Felipe Eduardo Salvador as Chapinha
Babu Santana as Beto
Thogun as Ignacio

References

External links
  
 
 

2008 films
2000s Japanese-language films
2000s Mandarin-language films
2000s Portuguese-language films
Brazilian thriller films
Films shot in São Paulo
Films set in São Paulo
2008 thriller films
Films directed by Yu Lik-wai
Yakuza films
Triad films
2008 multilingual films
Brazilian multilingual films
2000s Japanese films
2000s Hong Kong films